Al Watan (meaning The Homeland) is an Arabic daily newspaper published in Manama, Bahrain. It is known to have a pro-government stance.

History and profile
Al Watan was launched on 10 December 2005. The publisher of the daily is Al Watan for Publishing and Distribution Company. Yusuf Albinkhalil is the editor-in-chief of the daily. Its board of advisers mostly includes Salafis. The paper is based in Manama.

The online edition of the paper was the 46th most visited website for 2010 in the MENA region.

Content and political stance
The daily has supplements in business and sports.

It is a pro-government daily newspaper according to Human Rights Watch. However; the paper describes itself as independent. On the other hand, it is under the effect of Saudi Arabia through Salafi members of the advisory board.

References

2005 establishments in Bahrain
Newspapers established in 2005
Arabic-language newspapers
Newspapers published in Bahrain
Mass media in Manama